Brendan Jay Young (born 5 May 1992) is a South African cricketer. He plays for the Cape Cobras.

Domestic career
Young, who had a formidable high school cricketing career (Young took 9 wickets and scored 102 in his 100th first team match) at Westerford High School. At the age of 20, Young moved to the KwaZulu-Natal in early 2011, due to the amount of young cricketers graduating to play for the Dolphins. However, after a disappointing season, Young moved to his home side of Western Province and gained a reputation as a genuinely quick and raw pace bowler, as well as a useful lower-order batsman. This led to a contract with the Cape Cobras at the start of the 2012/13 season.

1992 births
Living people
Cricketers from Cape Town
South African cricketers
South African people of British descent
Cape Cobras cricketers